Yuki Nakashima may refer to:
 Yuki Nakashima (footballer)
 Yuki Nakashima (actress)

See also
 Yuki Nakajima, Japanese biathlete